Croda International plc is a British speciality chemicals company based at Snaith, England. It is listed on the London Stock Exchange.

History
The company was founded by George William Crowe and Henry James Dawe in 1925. Crowe bought an abandoned waterworks facility at Rawcliffe Bridge for £7, which would later be used to manufacture the company's first barrels of lanolin, a natural protective fat present in sheep's wool. The company was named Croda (a combination of the first few letters of his surname with that of his partner, Dawe).

Crowe and Dawe began working on a process to extract lanolin from sheep’s wool for various industries, including uses in cosmetics, as a waterproofing agent, and as a dressing for leather. At the time, the UK imported lanolin, having no domestic lanolin production at all.

Dawe's extraction process failed initially and Dawe left the company. Philip Wood, Crowe's nephew, was appointed manager of the site in 1925, and Wood worked closely with a Belgian chemist to develop a new extraction process. By the end of the year Croda had successfully produced its first batch of lanolin.

The company struggled to remain profitable to the end of the decade until a report from the National Physical Laboratory was published describing the rust prevention properties of lanolin, creating new business opportunities for the company. The lanolin market was still in its infancy as the World Depression began to take hold in Britain, but Croda was able to expand their domestic market and exports through the 1930s as Wood refined Dawe's production process and gradually developed a wider range of product applications for lanolin.

To aid in military production during World War II, Croda began producing camouflage paints, gun lubrication and cleaning oils, insect repellents, and other resources the British Empire required.

When Wood died in 1949, aged 46, the board decided to run the business by committee, with Wood's son Frederick Wood appointed sales director. In 1950 Fred relocated to New York to set up the company's U.S. subsidiary, Croda Inc. In 1953 Fred returned to the UK and was appointed Croda's managing director, aged just 27.

Under Fred Wood's management Croda experienced a sustained period of rapid growth. Leading cosmetics companies started using its products in the 1950s and at that time it also began to expand internationally: it moved to its present location in 1956.

In 1957, Croda Inc. acquired Hummel Chemical Company and began manufacturing in a new Newark, NJ plant.

It was first listed on the London Stock Exchange in 1964. It expanded rapidly in the 1960s acquiring United Premier Oil in 1967 and British Glues & Chemicals in 1968.

In 1970, Croda acquired L&H Holdings and A B Fleming for ink and synthetic resin production and acquired Midland-Yorkshire Tar Distillers in 1975.

In 1990 it developed Lorenzo's oil, a product famously used to treat adrenoleukodystrophy. In 1998 it bought Westbrook Lanolin.

More recently it has concentrated on speciality chemicals and in 2006 it announced that it had reached a deal with ICI to acquire ICI's Uniqema for a total consideration of £410 million. It announced an offer to acquire Plant Impact, an agricultural bioscience business, for £10 million in February 2018.

In November 2020, it was announced that Croda will be purchasing Spanish home-products company Iberchem for €820 million. The planned purchase was intended to increase the company's sales of fragrance formulations in various markets including China and the Middle East.

Operations
The company's products include:

Surfactants which are used as ingredients for cosmetic creams and lotions. 
Dietary supplements containing speciality lipids, such as omega-3 oils. 
Fatty acid amides which add "slip" to plastic surfaces, so plastic bags can be peeled apart easily.

These products are sold to other manufacturing companies. Croda has factories in the United Kingdom, France, Spain, Italy, the Netherlands, the United States, Brazil, Singapore, India, Indonesia, Korea, and Japan.

References

External links
 Official site

 
Chemical companies of the United Kingdom
British companies established in 1925
Chemical companies established in 1925
Companies listed on the London Stock Exchange
Companies based in the East Riding of Yorkshire
1925 establishments in England